The name Syria is latinized from the Greek . In toponymic typology, the term Syria is classified among choronyms (proper names of regions and countries). The origin and usage of the term has been the subject of interest, both among ancient writers and modern scholars. "Syria" in the Roman period referred to the region of Syria (the western Levant), while Assyria (Asōristān, Athura) in Mesopotamia was part of the Sasanian Empire and only very briefly came under Roman control (AD 116–118, marking the historical peak of Roman expansion). Henceforth the Greeks applied the term without distinction between the Assyrians of Mesopotamia and Arameans of the Levant.

Etymologically, the name Syria is thought to be connected to Assyria, which was a major ancient Mesopotamian civilization in modern-day Iraq which existed as a city-state from the 21st century BC to the 14th century BC and then as a territorial state and eventually an empire from the 14th century BC to the 7th century BC. Assyria reached as far as northeastern Syria, southeastern Turkey and fringes of northwestern Iran, ultimately from the Akkadian . Theodor Nöldeke in 1871 was the first to give philological support to the assumption that Syria and Assyria have the same etymology, a suggestion going back to John Selden (1617). Current academic opinion favors the connection.

Modern Syria ( "Syrian Arab Republic", since 1961) inherits its name from the Ottoman Syria vilayet (Vilâyet-i Sûriye), established in 1865. The choice of the ancient regional name, instead of a more common Ottoman practice of naming provinces according to provincial capitals, was seen as a reflection of growing historical consciousness among the local intellectuals at the time.

The Classical Arabic name for the region is  bilād aš-ša'm ("The land of Shem") eldest son of Noah, Modern Standard Arabic  aš-šām) from   "left hand; northern". In contrast, Baalshamin, was a Semitic sky-god in Canaan/Phoenicia and ancient Palmyra. Hence, Sham refers to (heaven or sky).

Etymology
The majority of modern scholars strongly support the already dominant position that 'Syrian' and Syriac indeed derived from 'Assyrian', and the recent (1997) discovery of the bilingual Çineköy inscription from the 8th century BCE, written in the Luwian and Phoenician languages, seems to clearly confirm that Syria is ultimately derived from the Assyrian term Aššūrāyu.

Noting the scholarly consensus on questions related to interpretation of the terms Syria/Assyria in the Çineköy inscription, some researchers have also analyzed some similar terms that appear in other contemporary inscriptions, suggesting some additional interpretations.

The question was addressed from the Early Classical period through to the Renaissance Era by the likes of Herodotus, Strabo, Justinus, Michael the Syrian and John Selden, with each of these stating that Syrian/Syriac was synonymous with and derivative of Assyrian. Acknowledgments were being made as early as the 5th century BC in the Hellenistic world that the Indo-European term Syrian was derived from the much earlier Assyrian.

Some 19th-century historians such as Ernest Renan had dismissed the etymological identity of the two toponyms. In this case, the name would derive directly from that of the language isolate-speaking Hurrians, and be unrelated to the name Aššur. Tvedtnes' explanation was rejected as highly unlikely by Frye in 1992.

Various theories have been advanced as to the etymological connections between the two terms. Some scholars suggest that the term Assyria included a definite article, similar to the function of the Arabic language "Al-". Theodor Nöldeke in 1871 gave philological support to the assumption that Syria and Assyria have the same etymology, a suggestion going back to John Selden (1617) rooted in his own Hebrew tradition about the descent of Assyrians from Jokshan. Majority and mainstream current academic opinion strongly favours that Syria originates from Assyria. In a hieroglyphic Luwian and Phoenician bilingual monumental inscription found in Çineköy, Turkey, (the Çineköy inscription) belonging to Urikki, vassal king of Que (i.e. Cilicia), dating to the eighth century BC, reference is made to the relationship between his kingdom and his Assyrian overlords. The Luwian inscription reads  whereas the Phoenician translation reads , i.e.  "Assur", and also mentions  "Assyrians", which according to Rollinger "settles the problem once and for all".

According to a different hypothesis, the name Syria might be derived from "Sirion" ( Širyôn, meaning "breastplate"), the name that the Phoenicians (especially Sidonians) gave to Mount Hermon, firstly mentioned in an Ugaritic poem about Baal and Anath:

History

Historical use of the term Syria can be divided into three periods. The first period, attested from the 8th century BCE, reflects the original Luwian and Cilician use of the term Syria as synonym for Assyria, rather than modern Syria (the northeast aside) which was known as Aramea and Eber-Nari at that time. Such use was recorded in the bilingual (Luwian-Phoenician) Çineköy inscription.

Through contacts with Luwians, Cilicians and Phoenicians, ancient Greeks also learned both variants (Syria/Assyria), used as synonyms, but later started to introduce some distinctions, thus marking the beginning of the second (transitional) period, attested by the works of Greek historian Herodotus (5th century BCE). Some instances in his writings reflect the original (synonymous) use of Syrian and Assyrian designations, when used for the Assyrian people in Mesopotamia. Herodotus explicitly stated that those called Syrians by the Greeks were called Assyrians by the non-Greeks, On the other side, he stated that Syrians were called Cappadocians, by Persians. Herodotus also introduced some distinctions regarding the territorial scope of the terms Syria and Assyria. Randolph Helm emphasized that Herodotus never applied the term Syria on the Mesopotamian region of Assyria which he always called "Assyria".

The third period was marked by definite territorialization of the term Syria, as distinctive from Assyria. That process was finalized already during the Seleucid era (312-64 BCE), when Hellenistic (Greek) notions were applied in the region, and specific terms like Coele-Syria were introduced, corresponding to western regions (ancient Aram), unrelated to ancient Assyria which was still extant as a geopolitical entity. Such distinctions were later inherited by the Romans, who created the province of Syria, for regions western of Euphrates, while Assyria represented a distinctive geographical term, related to Assyrian-inhabited regions in northern and eastern Mesopotamia and south east Anatolia. In the Roman Empire, "Syria" in its broadest sense referred to lands situated between Asia Minor and Egypt, i.e. the western Levant, while "Assyria" was part of the Persian Empire as Athura, and only very briefly came under Roman control (116–118 AD, marking the historical peak of Roman expansion), where it was known as Assyria Provincia.

In 1864, the Ottoman Vilayet Law was promulgated to form the Syria Vilayet. The new provincial law was implemented in Damascus in 1865, and the reformed province was named Suriyya/Suriye, reflecting a growing historical consciousness among the local intellectuals.

See also

Notes

References

Sources

 
 
 
 
 
 
 
 
 
 
 
 
 
 
 
 
 
 
 
 
 
 
 
 
 
 
 
 
 
 
 
 
 
 

Syria
History of Syria
Syria (region)